Gawronki  is a village in the administrative district of Gmina Rudna, within Lubin County, Lower Silesian Voivodeship, in south-western Poland. It was part of Germany prior to the reorganization of German borders after World War II.

Gawrony Castle is located nearby.

References

Gawronki